is a Japanese kickboxer competing in K-1 at middleweight (−70 kg). He is the former world champion of Muay Thai in WKA and WPKC, and he won the Japanese national tournament of K-1 twice in 2006 and 2007. His official nickname is "Mugen Sniper" which means Infinite Sniper. He is Matsuzaka Generation.

Biography

Amateur era 
Born in Nagoya, Aichi, Japan on January 25, 1981, Sato began training in kickboxing in 1994 when he was in his second year of junior high school. Originally, Sato had been going to visit a boxing gym with his friend, but he argued and fought just before visiting. Sato was defeated completely in the fight. For this incident, he visited "Nagoya JK Factory", a kickboxing gym near to Sato's house, and started learning kickboxing. He won the Glove Karate Open Championship Tournament when he was just 16 years old, still in his second year of high school. He also won the championship the next year in 1997.

Fight as a professional kickboxer 
He passed the examination for professional kickboxing of New Japan Kickboxing Federation (NJKF) in 1998. He won his first match against Isao Miyamoto by decision on December 25, 1998. He changed his weight class from lightweight to welterweight in April 2000. He moved to All Japan Kickboxing Federation from NJKF in June 2001. He won the title of WKA World Muay Thai Welterweight by KO Milan Stevic in Germany on 23 November 2001. It was the first time for him to fight in the oversea.

Entry to K-1 
In his K-1 debut on May 3, 2005, he beat William Diender by decision. He lost to Virgil Kalakoda in a K-1 Superfight in the K-1 MAX Finals. On October 12, 2005, he defeated Kaoklai Kaennorsing, the only fighter who has fought in both K-1's heavyweight division and in K-1 MAX. On February 4, 2006 he defeated Akeomi Nitta, Ryuki Ueyama and Tatsuji to win the K-1 MAX Japan Grand Prix 2006 tournament. On February 5, 2007 he won the K-1 MAX Japan Grand Prix 2007 tournament. In April 2007 he lost to Dutch fighter Andy Souwer by decision. His latest fight was on July 7, 2008 in which he defeated Buakaw Por. Pramuk by KO in the 3rd round in the Quarterfinals for the K-1 MAX Finals and he is set to fight Masato on October 10, 2008.

On February 17, 2012, Sato defeated Fadi Merza via unanimous decision after 5th round to take the Merza's ISKA World Light Middleweight (-72.3 kg) Championship under Oriental rules in Tokyo, Japan.

He was scheduled to face Dzhabar Askerov in a tournament reserve bout at Glory 3: Rome - 2012 Middleweight Slam Final 8 to be held on November 3, 2012 in Rome, Italy. However, when quarter finalist Albert Kraus came down with the flu, Sato was given his place in the tournament proper. He was TKO'd by Sanny Dahlbeck.

In an upset, Sato lost a unanimous decision to Kenta in the co-main event of Krush.26 in Tokyo on January 28, 2013.

He broke a three-fight losing streak when he took a majority decision win over Henri van Opstal at Shootboxing 2013 - Act 1 in Tokyo on February 22, 2013.

Sato defeated Lee Sun-Hyun via unanimous decision at Glory 8: Tokyo - 2013 65kg Slam in Tokyo on May 3, 2013.

He beat Yuichiro Nagashima by unanimous decision at Hoost Cup: Kings in Nagoya, Japan on June 16, 2013.

Sato beat Shintaro Matsukura by unanimous decision at Krush.32 in Nagoya on September 1, 2013.

In their fourth meeting, Sato lost to Buakaw Banchamek on points at MAX Muay Thai 4 in Sendai, Japan on October 6, 2013.

He lost to Dzhabar Askerov by unanimous decision at Tech-Krep FC: Southern Front 2 in Kyiv, Ukraine on December 8, 2013.

Sato lost via unanimous decision to Petchmankong Gaiyanghaadao at Hoost Cup: Legend in Nagoya, Japan on March 23, 2014.

Titles

Amateur
All Japan Glove Karate Federation
1996 Glove Karate Open championship winner
1997 Glove Karate Open championship winner

Professional
World Kickboxing AssociationWKA Muay Thai World Welterweight champion (Defence: 1)World Professional Kickboxing CouncilWPKC Muay Thai World Super welterweight champion (Defence: 1)
K-1
K-1 World MAX 2006 Japan Tournament winner
K-1 World MAX 2007 Japan Tournament winner
K-1 World MAX 2010 runner upInternational Sport Karate AssociationISKA World Light Middleweight (-72.3 kg) ChampionshipAll Japan Kickboxing Federation2004 AJFK Skill AwardNew Japan Kickboxing Federation1999 The Rookie of the Year (NJKF)

 Kickboxing record 

|-
|-  bgcolor="FFBBBB"
| 2015-05-04 || Loss || align=left| Jordann Pikeur || Krush 54 || Tokyo, Japan || KO || 2 ||  || 54-25-1
|-  bgcolor="FFBBBB"
| 2015-01-18 || Loss || align=left| Sanny Dahlbeck || K-1 World GP 2015 -60kg Championship Tournament || Tokyo, Japan || KO || 4 || 2:08 || 54-24-1
|-  bgcolor="CCFFCC"
| 2014-08-24 || Win  || align=left| Yamazaki Yoichi || Krush.45 || Nagoya, Japan || Decision (unanimous) || 3 || 3:00 || 54-23-1
|-  bgcolor= "#c5d2ea"
| 2014-05-17 || Draw || align=left| Xu Yan || Hero Legends  || Shenzhen, China || Decision || 3 || 3:00 ||53-23-1 
|-
! style=background:white colspan=9 |
|-
|-
|-  bgcolor="FFBBBB"
| 2014-03-23 || Loss || align=left| Petchmankong Gaiyanghaadao || Hoost Cup: Legend || Nagoya, Japan || Decision (unanimous) || 3 || 3:00 || 53-23
|-
|-  bgcolor="FFBBBB"
| 2013-12-08 || Loss || align=left| Dzhabar Askerov || Tech-Krep FC: Southern Front 2 || Kyiv, Ukraine || Decision (unanimous) || 3 || 3:00 || 53-22
|-
|-  bgcolor="FFBBBB"
| 2013-10-06 || Loss ||align=left| Buakaw Banchamek || MAX Muay Thai 4 || Sendai, Japan || Decision || 3 || 3:00 || 53-21
|-
|-  bgcolor="CCFFCC"
| 2013-09-01 || Win ||align=left| Shintaro Matsukura || Krush.32 || Nagoya, Japan || Decision (unanimous) || 3 || 3:00 || 53-20
|-
|-  bgcolor="CCFFCC"
| 2013-06-16 || Win ||align=left| Yuichiro Nagashima || Hoost Cup: Kings || Nagoya, Japan || Decision (unanimous) || 3 || 3:00 || 52-20
|-
|-  bgcolor="CCFFCC"
| 2013-05-03 || Win ||align=left| Lee Sung-Hyun || Glory 8: Tokyo || Tokyo, Japan || Decision (unanimous) || 3 || 3:00 || 51-20
|-
|-  bgcolor="CCFFCC"
| 2013-02-22 || Win ||align=left| Henri van Opstal || Shootboxing 2013 - Act 1 || Tokyo, Japan || Decision (majority) || 3 || 3:00 || 50-20
|-
|-  bgcolor="FFBBBB"
| 2013-01-28 || Loss ||align=left| Kenta || Krush.26 || Tokyo, Japan || Decision (unanimous) || 3 || 3:00 || 49-20
|-
|-  bgcolor="FFBBBB"
| 2012-10-02 || Loss ||align=left| Sanny Dahlbeck || Glory 3: Rome - 70 kg Slam Tournament, Quarter Finals || Rome, Italy || TKO (knee to the body) || 2 || || 49-19
|-
|-  bgcolor="#FFBBBB"
| 2012-05-26 || Loss ||align=left|  Shemsi Beqiri || Glory 1: Stockholm - 70 kg Slam Tournament, First Round  || Stockholm, Sweden  || Decision (Unanimous) || 3 || 3.00 || 49-18
|-
|-  bgcolor=#CCFFCC
| 2012-02-17 || Win ||align=left| Fadi Merza || Krush.16 || Tokyo, Japan || Decision (Unanimous)|| 5 || 3:00 || 49-17
|-
! style=background:white colspan=9 |
|-
|-  bgcolor="#FFBBBB"
| 2011-11-27 || Loss ||align=left| Alex Tobiasson Harris || Rumble of the Kings 2011 || Stockholm, Sweden || Decision (Unanimous) || 3 || 3:00 || 48-17
|-  bgcolor=#CCFFCC
| 2011-06-25 || Win ||align=left| Albert Kraus || K-1 World MAX 2011 -63kg Japan Tournament Final, Super fight || Tokyo, Japan|| Decision (2-0) || 3 || 3:00 || 48-16
|-  bgcolor="#FFBBBB"
| 2011-04-23 ||Loss ||align=left| Andy Souwer || Shootboxing 2011 Act 2 || Tokyo, Japan || Decision (3-0)|| 3 || 3:00 || 47-16
|-  bgcolor="#FFBBBB"
| 2011-03-12 || Loss ||align=left| Armen Petrosyan || Fight Code: Dragon Series Round 2 || Milan, Italy || Decision (Unanimous) || 3 || 3:00 || 47-15
|-  bgcolor=#CCFFCC
| 2011-01-09 || Win ||align=left| Shemsi Beqiri || Krush -63 kg The First Championship Tournament Round.2 || Tokyo, Japan || Decision (Split) || 3 || 3:00 || 47-14
|-  bgcolor=#FFBBBB
| 2010-11-08 || Loss ||align=left| Giorgio Petrosyan || K-1 World MAX 2010 Final, final || Tokyo, Japan || Decision (Unanimous) || 3 || 3:00 || 46-14
|-
! style=background:white colspan=9 |
|-
|-  bgcolor=#CCFFCC
| 2010-11-08 || Win ||align=left| Gago Drago || K-1 World MAX 2010 Final, semi finals || Tokyo, Japan || Decision (Unanimous) || 3 || 3:00 || 46-13
|-  bgcolor=#CCFFCC
| 2010-11-08 || Win ||align=left| Michał Głogowski || K-1 World MAX 2010 Final, quarter finals || Tokyo, Japan || Decision (Unanimous) || 3 || 3:00 || 45-13
|-
|-  bgcolor=#CCFFCC
| 2010-08-14 || Win ||align=left| Yuji Nashiro || Krush 9 || Tokyo, Japan || Decision (Unanimous) || 3 || 3:00 || 44-13
|-  bgcolor=#CCFFCC
| 2010-07-05 || Win ||align=left| Yuya Yamamoto || K-1 World MAX 2010 Final 16 - Part 1 || Tokyo, Japan || Decision (Majority) || 3 || 3:00 || 43-13
|-
! style=background:white colspan=9 |
|-
|-  bgcolor=#FFBBBB
| 2010-05-29 || Loss ||align=left| Pajonsuk || It's Showtime 2010 Amsterdam || Amsterdam, Netherlands || Decision (0-5) || 3 || 3:00 || 42-13
|-  bgcolor=
| 2010-05-16 || Ex ||align=left| Kozo Takeda || SNKA "Final Takeda Kozo Retirement Event" || Bunkyo, Tokyo, Japan || No Decision || 2 || 2:11 || 
|-  bgcolor=#CCFFCC
| 2010-03-27 || Win ||align=left| Danilo Zanolini || K-1 World MAX 2010 –70 kg Japan Tournament || Saitama, Japan || KO (Right knee) || 1 || 3:00 || 42-12
|-  bgcolor="#CCFFCC"
| 2009-12-23 || Win ||align=left| Crazy Teru || Yamato gym 40th & Nagoya JKF 20th Anniversary Memorial Event || Nagoya, Aichi, Japan || KO (Left low kick) || 3 || 1:30 || 41-12
|-  bgcolor=#CCFFCC
| 2009-10-26 || Win ||align=left| Yasuhiro Kido || K-1 World MAX 2009 Final || Yokohama, Japan || KO (Right hook) || 2 || 2:23 || 40-12
|-  bgcolor=#CCFFCC
| 2009-07-13 || Win ||align=left| Joerie Mes || K-1 World MAX 2009 Final 8 || Tokyo, Japan || Ext R. Decision (Split) || 4 || 3:00 || 39-12
|-  bgcolor=#FFBBBB
| 2009-04-21 || Loss ||align=left| Gago Drago || K-1 World MAX 2009 Final 16 || Fukuoka, Japan || Ext R. Decision (Unanimous) || 4 || 3:00 || 38-12
|-  bgcolor=#CCFFCC
| 2009-02-23 || Win ||align=left| Sergey Golyaev || K-1 World MAX 2009 Japan Tournament || Tokyo, Japan || KO (Right low kick) || 2 || 1:18 || 38-11
|-  bgcolor=#FFBBBB
| 2008-12-31 || Loss ||align=left| Artur Kyshenko || Dynamite!! 2008 || Saitama, Japan || Decision (Majority) || 3 || 3:00 || 37-11
|-  bgcolor=#FFBBBB
| 2008-10-01 || Loss ||align=left| Masato || K-1 World MAX 2008 Final || Tokyo, Japan || Ext R. Decision (Unanimous) || 4 || 3:00 || 37-10
|-  bgcolor=#CCFFCC
| 2008-07-07 || Win ||align=left| Buakaw Por. Pramuk || K-1 World MAX 2008 Final 8 || Tokyo, Japan || KO (Knee to the body + right hook) || 3 || 1:50 || 37-9
|-  bgcolor=#CCFFCC
| 2008-04-09 || Win ||align=left| Murat Direkci || K-1 World MAX 2008 Final 16 || Tokyo, Japan || Decision (Unanimous) || 3 || 3:00 || 36-9
|-  bgcolor=#FFBBBB
| 2008-02-02 || Loss ||align=left| Buakaw Por. Pramuk || K-1 World MAX 2008 Japan Tournament || Tokyo, Japan || Ext R. Decision (Split) || 4 || 3:00 || 35-9
|-  bgcolor=#FFBBBB
| 2007-10-03 || Loss ||align=left| Albert Kraus || K-1 World MAX 2007 World Championship Final || Tokyo, Japan || Decision (Unanimous) || 3 || 3:00 || 35-8
|-  bgcolor=#CCFFCC
| 2007-06-28 || Win ||align=left| Denis Schneidmiller || K-1 World MAX 2007 World Tournament Final Elimination || Tokyo, Japan || Decision (Unanimous) || 3 || 3:00 || 35-7
|-  bgcolor=#FFBBBB
| 2007-04-04 || Loss ||align=left| Andy Souwer || K-1 World MAX 2007 World Elite Showcase || Tokyo, Japan || Decision (Unanimous) || 3 || 3:00 || 34-7
|-  bgcolor=#CCFFCC
| 2007-02-05 || Win ||align=left| Tatsuji || K-1 World MAX 2007 Japan Tournament || Tokyo, Japan || KO (Right flying knee) || 1 || 2:25 || 34-6
|-
! style=background:white colspan=9 |
|-
|-  bgcolor=#CCFFCC
| 2007-02-05 || Win ||align=left| Keiji Ozaki || K-1 World MAX 2007 Japan Tournament || Tokyo, Japan || Decision (Unanimous) || 3 || 3:00 || 33-6
|-  bgcolor=#CCFFCC
| 2007-02-05 || Win ||align=left| Yasuhito Shirasu || K-1 World MAX 2007 Japan Tournament || Tokyo, Japan || Decision (Unanimous) || 3 || 3:00 || 32-6
|-  bgcolor=#FFBBBB
| 2006-09-04 || Loss ||align=left| Albert Kraus || K-1 World MAX 2006 Champions' Challenge || Tokyo, Japan || Decision (Majority) || 3 || 3:00 || 31-6
|-  bgcolor=#FFBBBB
| 2006-06-30 || Loss ||align=left| Buakaw Por.Pramuk || K-1 World MAX 2006 World Championship Final || Yokohama, Japan || KO (Left hook) || 2 || 0:18 || 31-5 
|-  bgcolor=#CCFFCC
| 2006-04-05 || Win ||align=left| Mike Zambidis || K-1 World MAX 2006 World Tournament Open || Tokyo, Japan || Decision (Unanimous) || 3 || 3:00 || 31-4
|-  bgcolor=#CCFFCC
| 2006-02-04 || Win ||align=left| Tatsuji || K-1 World MAX 2006 Japan Tournament || Saitama, Japan || Decision (Unanimous) || 3 || 3:00 || 30-4
|-
! style=background:white colspan=9 |
|-
|-  bgcolor=#CCFFCC
| 2006-02-04 || Win ||align=left| Ryuki Ueyama || K-1 World MAX 2006 Japan Tournament || Saitama, Japan || TKO (Doctor Stoppage) || 1 || 3:00 || 29-4
|-  bgcolor=#CCFFCC
| 2006-02-04 || Win ||align=left| Akeomi Nitta || K-1 World MAX 2006 Japan Tournament || Saitama, Japan || Decision (Unanimous) || 3 || 3:00 || 28-4
|-  bgcolor=#CCFFCC
| 2005-10-12 || Win ||align=left| Kaoklai Kaennorsing || K-1 World MAX 2005 Champions' Challenge || Tokyo, Japan || Decision (Majority) || 3 || 3:00 || 27-4
|-  bgcolor=#FFBBBB
| 2005-07-20 || Loss ||align=left| Virgil Kalakoda || K-1 World MAX 2005 Championship Final || Kanagawa, Japan || Decision (Majority) || 3 || 3:00 || 26-4
|-  bgcolor=#CCFFCC
| 2005-05-03 || Win ||align=left| William Diender || K-1 World MAX 2005 World Tournament Open || Tokyo, Japan || Decision (Unanimous) || 3 || 3:00 || 26-3
|-  bgcolor=#CCFFCC
| 2005-02-06 || Win ||align=left| Yuya Yamamoto || All Japan Kickboxing 2005: Moving || Japan || Decision (Unanimous) || 5 || 3:00 || 25-3
|-  bgcolor=#CCFFCC
| 2004-11-27 || Win ||align=left| Ittiphol Akkarivorn || Italy Gala || Italy || KO (Throw towel) || 4 || || 24-3
|-
! style=background:white colspan=9 |
|-
|-  bgcolor=#CCFFCC
| 2004-09-25 || Win ||align=left| Dieselek Rungruangyon || Muaythailumpineekrikkri Fights, Lumpinee Stadium || Bangkok, Thailand || KO (Low kick) || 1 || 1:15 || 23-3
|-  bgcolor=#CCFFCC
| 2004-07-24 || Win ||align=left| Peter Crooke || All Japan Kickboxing 2004: Super Fighter Maximum || Japan || KO (Low kick) || 3 || 1:33 || 22-3
|-  bgcolor=#FFBBBB
| 2004-04-17 || Loss ||align=left| Changpeuk Chor Sriprasert || Muaythailumpineekrikkri Fights, Lumpinee Stadium || Bangkok, Thailand || TKO (Doctor stoppage) || 4 || || 21-3
|-
! style=background:white colspan=9 |
|-
|-  bgcolor=#CCFFCC
| 2004-02-28 || Win ||align=left| Asan Benfache || Kombat Festival 2004 || Netherlands || Decision (Unanimous) || 5 || 3:00 || 21-2
|-
! style=background:white colspan=9 |
|-
|-  bgcolor=#CCFFCC
| 2003-12-06 || Win ||align=left| Shane Chapman || SuperLeague Netherlands 2003 || Rotterdam, Netherlands || TKO (Doc stop/cut shin) || 2 || 3:00 || 20-2
|-  bgcolor=#CCFFCC
| 2003-08-17 || Win ||align=left| Kaolan Kaovichit || All Japan Kickboxing 2003: Hurricane Blow || Japan || Decision (Unanimous) || 5 || 3:00 || 19-2
|-
! style=background:white colspan=9 |
|-
|-  bgcolor=#CCFFCC
| 2003-06-20 || Win ||align=left| Chris van Venrooij || All Japan Kickboxing 2003: Dead Heat || Japan || Decision (Unanimous) || 5 || 3:00 || 18-2
|-  bgcolor=#CCFFCC
| 2003-04-12 || Win ||align=left| Ittiphol Akkarivorn || Palasport Arcella || Netherlands || KO (Left hook) || 2 || || 17-2
|-  bgcolor=#FFBBBB
| 2002-11-24 || Loss ||align=left| Fikri Tyarti || Victory or Hell || Amsterdam, Netherlands || Decision (Unanimous) || 5 || 3:00 || 16-2
|-
! style=background:white colspan=9 |
|-
|-  bgcolor=#CCFFCC
| 2002-10-17 || Win ||align=left| Takahiko Shimizu || All Japan Kickboxing 2002: Brandnew Fight || Japan || Decision (Unanimous) || 5 || 3:00 || 16-1
|-  bgcolor=#CCFFCC
| 2002-07-21 || Win ||align=left| Shingo Eguchi || All Japan Kickboxing 2002: Crush || Japan || TKO (Doctor stoppage/cut) || 2 || 2:33 || 15-1
|-  bgcolor=#CCFFCC
| 2002-04-12 || Win ||align=left| Charimsak Ingram Gym || All Japan Kickboxing 2002: Rising Force || Japan || Decision (Unanimous) || 5 || 3:00 || 14-1
|-  bgcolor=#CCFFCC
| 2002-02-15 || Win ||align=left| Hisayuki Kanazawa || All Japan Kickboxing 2002: Vanguard || Japan || Decision (Unanimous) || 5 || 3:00 || 13-1
|-  bgcolor=#CCFFCC
| 2001-11-17 || Win ||align=left| Milan Stevic || Thai Kick Box Gala || Thailand || TKO (Throw towel) || 4 || 1:41 || 12-1
|-
! style=background:white colspan=9 |
|-
|-  bgcolor=#CCFFCC
| 2001-08-10 || Win ||align=left| Noel Soares || All Japan Kickboxing 2001: Hot Shot || Japan || KO (Left knee) || 3 || 2:22 || 11-1
|-  bgcolor=#CCFFCC
| 2001-06-17 || Win ||align=left| Tomohiro Chiba || All Japan Kickboxing 2001: Who's Next || Japan || KO || 1 || 1:38 || 10-1
|-  bgcolor=#CCFFCC
| 2001-03-20 || Win ||align=left| Khondej Shissen || NJKF "Challenge To Muay-Thai 4" || Japan || KO (Punch) || 5 || 2:45 || 9-1
|-  bgcolor=#CCFFCC
| 2001-02-12 || Win ||align=left| Choranthai Kiatchansin || NJKF "Challenge To Muay-Thai 2" || Thailand || Decision (Unanimous) || 5 || 3:00 || 8-1
|-  bgcolor=#FFBBBB
| 2000-11-26 || Loss ||align=left| Thanonsak Therrat || NJKF "Millennium Wars 10" || Thailand || TKO (3 knockdown/Left hook) || 1 || 2:00 || 7-1
|-  bgcolor=#CCFFCC
| 2000-09-24 || Win ||align=left| Atsushi Nakamura || NJKF "Millennium Wars 8" || Japan || KO (Knee) || 4 || 1:46 || 7-0
|-  bgcolor=#CCFFCC
| 2000-07-07 || Win ||align=left| Yasuyuki Hirokawa || NJKF "Millennium Wars 5" || Japan || KO (Knee) || 5 || 0:23 || 6-0
|-
! style=background:white colspan=9 |
|-
|-  bgcolor=#CCFFCC
| 2000-04-09 || Win ||align=left| Ryuji Hatsuda || NJKF "Yokohama Young Fight" || Yokohama, Japan || Decision (Unanimous) || 3 || 3:00 || 5-0
|-
! style=background:white colspan=9 |
|-
|-  bgcolor=#CCFFCC
| 2000-01-29 || Win ||align=left| Tatsuya Morimoto || NJKF "Millennium Wars 1" || Japan || Decision (Unanimous) || 5 || 3:00 || 4-0
|-  bgcolor=#CCFFCC
| 1999-08-29 || Win ||align=left| Takenori Kato || NJKF || Japan || KO || 2 || || 3-0
|-  bgcolor=#CCFFCC
| 1999-06-04 || Win ||align=left| Masato Okawa || NJKF || Japan || Decision (Majority) || 3 || 3:00 || 2-0
|-  bgcolor=#CCFFCC
| 1998-12-25 || Win ||align=left| Isao Miyamoto || NJKF || Japan || Decision (Majority) || 3 || 3:00 || 1-0
|-
! style=background:white colspan=9 |
|-
|-
| colspan=9 | Legend''':

See also 
List of K-1 events
List of male kickboxers

References

External links
Yoshihiro Sato's official website

1981 births
Living people
Japanese male kickboxers
Welterweight kickboxers
Middleweight kickboxers
Japanese Muay Thai practitioners
Sportspeople from Nagoya